The Alfa Romeo 122 was a 12-cylinder inverted-V aircraft engine produced in 1941 by Alfa Romeo Milano as a licence-built Czechoslovakian Walter Sagitta, featuring a single-speed supercharger.

Specifications

See also

Notes

Bibliography
Archivio Storico Alfa Romeo - Volume II. Torino, novembre 1998.

External links 

Air-cooled aircraft piston engines
122
1930s aircraft piston engines
Inverted aircraft piston engines